"Cheri, Cheri Lady" is the only single released from Modern Talking's second album Let's Talk About Love, and it was the third single in a row that peaked at number one on the German singles chart, after "You're My Heart, You're My Soul" and "You Can Win If You Want". "Cheri, Cheri Lady" was released on 2 September 1985, but peaked at No. 1 in Germany on 14 October 1985. The single spent four weeks at the top and a total of 24 weeks on the singles chart in Germany and eventually went gold, selling well over 250,000 units there.

The single was certified silver in France for certified sales of 250,000 units.

Single releases
7-inch single
 "Cheri, Cheri Lady" – 3:45
 "Cheri, Cheri Lady" (Instrumental) – 3:37

12-inch maxi-single
 "Cheri, Cheri Lady" (Special Dance Version) – 4:52
 "Cheri, Cheri Lady" (Instrumental) – 3:37

Chart positions

Weekly charts

Year-end charts

Certifications and sales

"Cheri, Cheri Lady '98"

"Cheri, Cheri Lady '98" is Modern Talking's fourth single from their seventh album, Back for Good, and also the extended single after the duo's reunion featuring Eric Singleton. "Cheri, Cheri Lady '98" is the re-packaged version of the original 1985 version of "Cheri, Cheri Lady".

Track listing
 "Cheri, Cheri Lady '98" – 3:04
 "Cheri, Cheri Lady '98" (Extended Version) – 4:26

Capital Bra version

German rapper Capital Bra released a German-language version of the song with added rap verses in March 2019. The cover was released following Dieter Bohlen's comments in German media that he did not like modern rappers for flaunting their wealth, saying "everybody raps about his Maybach but at the end of the day they ride their bicycle home to their two-room flat" and that in 35 years nobody will remember Capital Bra's songs. Although Capital Bra initially criticised Bohlen's comments, the two later appeared in a video together on Instagram announcing the release of the cover. The YouTube video for the song was viewed over 500,000 times on its day of release. The song went on to become Capital Bra's twelfth number-one song in Germany, making him tie the record for having the most number-one singles along with The Beatles.

Charts

Weekly charts

Year-end charts

Certifications

Maléna version

Armenian singer Maléna released a cover version of the song featuring Armenian producer Tokionine on October 23, 2022. Malena said of the song on her Instagram, "I recorded a cover of a classic European hit from the 1980s because I thought the song would evoke nostalgia in many people". In February 2023, the song went viral on TikTok in Indonesia and Vietnam then reaching the top of the Top 50 Viral on Spotify and iTunes in Vietnam. On February 26, the song reached the general Top 50 songs in Vietnam on Spotify. The song debuted at number 72 on the Billboard Vietnam Hot 100 list published on March 2, 2023.

Charts

Weekly charts

Usage in media
"Cheri, Cheri Lady" is featured in the 2017 Indian film Arjun Reddy.

See also
Lists of number-one singles (Austria)
List of number-one hits of 1985 (Germany)
List of number-one songs in Norway
List of number-one singles of 1986 (Spain)
List of number-one singles of the 1980s (Switzerland)

References

External links

1985 songs
1985 singles
2019 singles
Modern Talking songs
Number-one singles in Austria
Number-one singles in Finland
Number-one singles in Germany
Number-one singles in Norway
Number-one singles in Spain
Number-one singles in Switzerland
Songs written by Dieter Bohlen
Song recordings produced by Jumpa